KAAJ-LP is a Religious formatted broadcast radio station.  The station is licensed to and serving Monticello in Utah.  KAAJ-LP is owned by First Baptist Church of Monticello, Utah and operated under their First Baptist Church licensee.

History
This station received its original construction permit for 103.5 FM from the Federal Communications Commission on May 7, 2001.  The new station was assigned the call letters KAAJ-LP by the FCC on August 23, 2001.  KAAJ-LP received its license to cover at 103.5 FM from the FCC on January 28, 2003.

In June 2005, KAAJ-LP applied to change its licensed broadcast frequency to 103.9 FM.  It received a new construction permit from the FCC on September 7, 2005.  KAAJ-LP received its license to cover at 103.9 FM from the FCC on August 2, 2006.  The station applied for and received the renewal of its license on September 27, 2013.

Programming
The station airs a Religious format including a mix of Nationally-syndicated religious teaching programs, syndicated music programs and talk shows, local news and community information, plus hourly news updates from USA Radio News.  In addition, KAAJ-LP airs live broadcasts of Monticello City Council sessions and of Monticello High School football and basketball games.

References

External links
 103.9 KAAJ Online
  The First Baptist Church of Monticello, Utah
 

2006 establishments in Utah
Radio stations established in 2006
AAJ-LP
San Juan County, Utah
Baptist Christianity in Utah